1,2-Octanediol, also known as caprylyl glycol, is a diol with the molecular formula CH(CH)CHOHCHOH.

It is a common component of many creams and ointments, where it is used as a skin conditioning agent. It is also noted to have some antimicrobial (preserving) ability.

See also
 1,8-Octanediol

References

Alkanediols
Vicinal diols